The first season of Malcolm in the Middle premiered on January 9, 2000, on Fox, and ended on May 21, 2000, with a total of sixteen episodes. Frankie Muniz stars as the title character Malcolm, and he is joined by Jane Kaczmarek, Bryan Cranston, Christopher Kennedy Masterson, Justin Berfield, Erik Per Sullivan and Catherine Lloyd Burns.

Episodes

Cast and characters

Main 
 Frankie Muniz as Malcolm
 Jane Kaczmarek as Lois
 Bryan Cranston as Hal
 Christopher Kennedy Masterson as Francis
 Justin Berfield as Reese
 Erik Per Sullivan as Dewey
 Catherine Lloyd Burns as Caroline Miller

Recurring 
 Craig Lamar Traylor as Stevie Kenarban
 David Anthony Higgins as Craig Feldspar
 Daniel von Bargen as Commandant Edwin Spangler
 Karim Prince as Cadet Stanley
 Drew Powell as Cadet Drew
 Merrin Dungey as Kitty Kenarban
 Dungey also plays Malcolm's teacher before he transfers to the Krelboyne class in the pilot episode
 Landry Allbright as Julie

Production

Development 
Malcolm in the Middle was created by Linwood Boomer and originally based at UPN. Four months later, the network passed on the series as it did not fit their target demographic; it was soon after picked up by Fox Broadcasting Company. Boomer based the series on his own life. He called the central family a "gigantically exaggerated and self-serving version" of his family and childhood: "My mother was very no-nonsense [...] Who could blame her? She was working while trying to keep up with four destructive and always hungry boys."

Casting 
The title character Malcolm was initially written as being nine years old. While auditioning, Frankie Muniz, who was 13 at the time, thought that he would not get it, believing he was "too old". However, the producers were impressed with Muniz, so he was cast, and the character was aged up. In the season, Malcolm's age is intentionally not mentioned, with the revelation only that he attends middle school, "not the actual grade level." Aaron Paul was interested in auditioning for the role of Malcolm's eldest brother Francis, but the producers were not interested in casting him; instead, the role went to Christopher Kennedy Masterson, who was cast after a single audition. Jane Kaczmarek initially did not want to play the matriarch of the family Lois, even after receiving the script, but then wondered, "Wow, they really love me [...] Maybe I should read this." After reading the script, she found that "there was something undeniably quirky and endearing about Lois", so she accepted.

Justin Berfield was cast as Malcolm's older brother Reese, despite the fact that Berfield is younger than Muniz, while Erik Per Sullivan was cast as the youngest brother Dewey, and Catherine Lloyd Burns as Malcolm's teacher Caroline Miller. The character of Hal, the patriarch of the family, was initially underwritten, and described by Boomer as "a writer's conceit that just lay there on the page like a turd". During Bryan Cranston's audition for the part, he had to simply be "listening to a fight between the mom and one of her sons" as required. At that time, Cranston put a pipe in his mouth and watched the fight, causing Boomer to fall from his chair while laughing. Boomer recalled that Cranston "just had this vast inner life going on." He described Cranston's look at that time as a man who "looks like he's listening, but he's actually building a rocket ship in his head", and Cranston was cast immediately.

Filming 
Much of the filming for the season was done on location from 1999 to 2000. Unlike other sitcoms, the makers avoided including laugh tracks or studio audience, and cinematography was done with single-camera to achieve a more "cinematic look". A privately owned home, located at 12334 Cantura Street in Studio City, California, was rented for upwards of $3,000 a day to film as Malcolm's house. School scenes were filmed at Colfax Elementary School. For the episode "Rollerskates", Cranston learned how to skate and performed most of his skating scenes, while a stunt double was used for the more complicated skating scenes. During "The Bots and the Bees", he wore a suit of live bees as required for the role. He was covered in 10,000 bees, but only got stung once, during which he did not flinch. In "Stock Car Races", when Hal and the boys are entering a race track, the billboard behind the entrance displays the place as Irwindale Speedway, a real race track in Southern California. The season finale was filmed at a water park called Wild Rivers located in Irvine, California.

Release

Broadcast history 
The season premiered on January 9, 2000 on Fox, and ended on May 21, 2000 with a total of sixteen episodes.

Home media 
The season was released on Region 1 DVD by 20th Century Fox Home Entertainment on October 28, 2002.

Reception

Critical response 
The review aggregator website Rotten Tomatoes calculated an approval rating of 100%, based on 23 reviews, with an average rating of 7.5/10. The site's consensus reads, "Malcolm in the Middle blasts out of the gate with a startlingly adept child performance from Frankie Muniz, a robust family ensemble, and a distinctive, punchy visual style." On Metacritic, the season has an 88% score based on 25 reviews, indicating "Universal acclaim".

Ratings 
The series started off with ratings of 23 million for the debut episode, and 26 million for the second episode.

References 

2000 American television seasons
Malcolm in the Middle